= Rio Vista, Virginia =

Unincorporated community in Virginia, US

Coordinates: 37°34′09″N 77°31′22″W

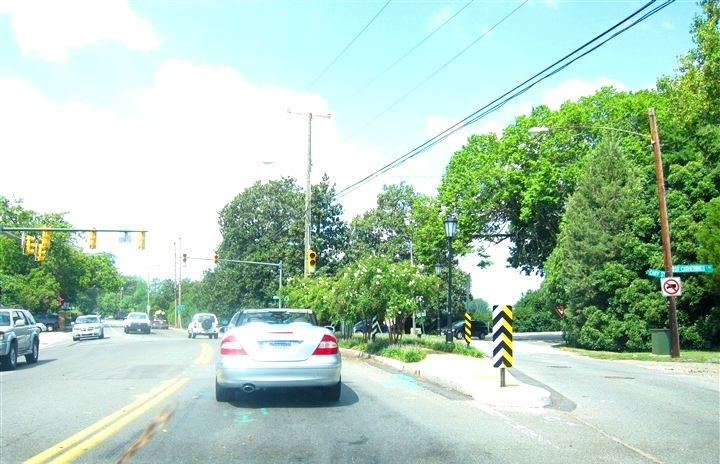
Rio Vista, 2014.

Rio Vista is an unincorporated community in the City of Richmond, in the U.S. state of Virginia. Located at intersection of Three Chopt Road and River Road.
